El Ejido is a corregimiento in Los Santos District, Los Santos Province, Panama, created on May 7, 2017 from parts of the corregimiento of Santa Ana.

References

Corregimientos of Los Santos Province
States and territories established in 2017